Fred Howard (30 January 1878 – 23 July 1942) was an Australian rules footballer who played with Fitzroy and Melbourne in the Victorian Football League (VFL).

Notes

External links 
		
 

1878 births
1942 deaths
Australian rules footballers from Victoria (Australia)
Fitzroy Football Club players
Melbourne Football Club players